The Queensland women's state handball team is the state handball team of Queensland which played in the 2009 Women's Oceania Handball Championship and finished runners-up to the Australian national team.

Tournament results

Oceania Handball Nations Cup record

Australian National Handball Championship

External links 
 Official webpage
 Oceania tournament results

Women's national handball teams
Queensland representative sports teams